Christian G. Strunz House, also known as the Sponhauer House, is a historic home located in Fort Wayne, Indiana. It was built in 1886–1887, and is a two-story, irregularly massed, Italianate style brick dwelling.  It has a steeply pitched roof with flat deck. The house was moved to 1017 W. Berry St. in 1980 to prevent its demolition.

It was listed on the National Register of Historic Places in 1979.

References

External links
Swinney Park

Houses on the National Register of Historic Places in Indiana
Houses completed in 1887
Italianate architecture in Indiana
National Register of Historic Places in Fort Wayne, Indiana
Houses in Fort Wayne, Indiana